The Halfmoon River is a  tidal river in the U.S. state of Georgia. It flows through saltmarshes connected to Wilmington Island in Chatham County, ending at Wassaw Sound, an arm of the Atlantic Ocean.

See also
List of rivers of Georgia

References 

USGS Hydrologic Unit Map - State of Georgia (1974)

Rivers of Georgia (U.S. state)
Rivers of Chatham County, Georgia